Marit Sandvik (born 19 July 1956 in Harstad, Norway) is a Norwegian jazz singer. Her husband is guitarist Øystein Norvoll and their daughter is the artist Dagny Norvoll Sandvik.

Career 
Sandvik has participated in numerous vocal and jazz groups in Harstad, Trondheim and Tromsø. In 1993 Sandvik established the sextet "Bossa Nordpå" including Helge Sveen, Henning Gravrok, Øystein Norvoll, Oddmund Finnseth and Finn Sletten. In 1997, she established the "Norvoll/Sandvik Duo" together with her husbond guitarist Øystein Norvoll, and was a part of the vocal quartet "Plagiacci", which in 1998 set up the Hasse&Tage]] revue Spader, Madam!. With her own quintet Marit Sandvik Band (etablert 1998), including Henning Gravrok, Eivind Valnes, Sigurd Ulveseth and Finn Sletten) She has toured internationally.

She contributes on the album Distant Reports (2001) facilitated by "Nordnorsk Jazzforum", Tonen og Kjærligheten (2005) with Jan Arvid Johansen, Evening Songs (2005) and World of Emily (2007) with Roger Johansen, Q (2009) with Henning Gravrok, Krig og kjærlighet (2010) with Jørgen Nordeng/Joddskis, Natt, stille (2010) and Nord (2011) with Tore Johansen. She lives in Tromsø and led "Tromsø Jazzklubb" (1990–1996).

Honors 
1993: Stubøprisen
2011: Nordlysprisen

Discography

Solo albums 
 1995: Song, Fall Soft (Taurus), with "Jazz i Nord"
 2002: Even Then (Mother Song) (Taurus), with Marit Sandvik Band
 2005: Uma Onda No Mar (Taurus), with Bossa Nordpå
 2016: Travel (AlfaMusic), with Maurizio Giammarco
 2017: Gå, Sveve (Turn Left), composer and lyricist Brynjulf Bjørklid

Collaborative works 
2001: Distant Reports
2005: Tonen og Kjærligheten, with Jan Arvid Johansen
2005: Evening Songs, with Roger Johansen
2007: World of Emily, with Roger Johansen
2007: Q, with Henning Gravrok
2010: Krig og kjærlighet, with Jørgen Nordeng/Joddskis
2010: Natt, stille, with Tore Johansen
2011: Nord, with Tore Johansen

References

External links 

Norwegian women jazz singers
Norwegian jazz composers
Taurus Records artists
Musicians from Harstad
1956 births
Living people
20th-century Norwegian women singers
20th-century Norwegian singers
21st-century Norwegian women singers
21st-century Norwegian singers